Helen Louise Morrison (born July 9, 1942) is an American forensic psychiatrist, writer and profiler. She was born in Greensburg, Pennsylvania and attended Temple University, the Medical College of Pennsylvania, and the Chicago Psychoanalytic Institute. Her work involves the psychology of serial killers.

Works 
The focus of her research has been to find common personality traits among serial killers. She has published a book, My Life Among the Serial Killers.

Morrison was a witness for the defense at the trial of John Wayne Gacy, testifying that he was legally insane because he was "unable to separate from his mother psychologically" and never developed a separate identity. The jury rejected Gacy's insanity defense and found him guilty. After his execution, Gacy's brain was removed and was in Morrison's possession.

References

1942 births
Living people
People from Greensburg, Pennsylvania
Temple University alumni
Drexel University alumni
American forensic psychiatrists
John Wayne Gacy
American women psychiatrists